Luis M. Rocha is the George J. Klir Professor of Systems Science at the Thomas J. Watson College of Engineering and Applied Science, Binghamton University (State University of New York). He has been director of the NSF-NRT Complex Networks and Systems graduate Program in Informatics at Indiana University, Bloomington, USA. He is also director of the Center for Social and Biomedical Complexity, between Binghamton University and Indiana University, Bloomington, a Fulbright Scholar, and Principal Investigator at the Instituto Gulbenkian de Ciencia, Portugal. His research is on complex systems and networks, computational and systems biology, biomedical complexity and digital health, and computational intelligence (including Artificial Life and Embodied Cognition).

Biography 

He was born in Luanda, Angola, moving to Lisbon, Portugal in his teens and completing an Licentiate (B.A. plus M.S.) in Mechanical and Systems Engineering at the Instituto Superior Técnico. He received his Ph.D in Systems Science in 1997 from the  Binghamton University. From 1998 to 2004 he was a staff scientist at the  Los Alamos National Laboratory, where he founded and led a Complex Systems Modeling Team during 1998-2002, and was part of the Santa Fe Institute research community. He has been the director of the NSF-NRT Interdisciplinary Training Program in Complex Networks and Systems, and Professor of Informatics in the Luddy School of Informatics, Computing, and Engineering at Indiana University, where he was a member of the advisory council of the Indiana University Network Science Institute, and core faculty of the Cognitive Science Program.  From 2005 to 2015 he was the director of the  Computational Biology Collaboratorium and in the Direction of the PhD program in Computational Biology at the Instituto Gulbenkian de Ciencia, where he remains a Principal Investigator. He has organized the Tenth International Conference on the Simulation and Synthesis of Living Systems (Alife X) and the Ninth European Conference on Artificial Life (ECAL 2007).

Research 

Dr. Rocha studies the systems properties of natural and artificial systems which enable them to adapt and evolve. He has approached this general topic by investigating how information and redundancy are fundamental for controlling the behavior and evolutionary capabilities of complex systems, as well as abstracting principles from natural systems to produce adaptive information technology.

Accepting Von Neumann's principle of self-replication and Turing's universal computation as a general principle for generating open-ended complexity that encompasses Natural Selection, Dr. Rocha has developed the work of Howard Pattee, Sydney Brenner, and others who regard computation and information as fundamental to understanding life, cognition and other complex systems (a good overview is Gleick's Book). From this viewpoint, he has approached several questions: how do cells and collectives of cells compute? Is language an evolutionary system operating under the same principle? Can artificial systems implement the same principle? Namely, can collective intelligence on the web become a super-organism implementing this principle?  From these questions, he has worked on various specific research projects ranging from Biomedical Literature Mining and Social Media Mining to understanding redundancy, robustness, modularity and control in Complex Networks,  Collective Intelligence on the Web and in Social Systems, and Agent-based models of Evolutionary Systems such as RNA Editing and Artificial Immune Systems.

Philosophical views 

Rocha is a proponent of embodied and situated cognition and has defended the grounded epistemological stance of evolutionary constructivism. He is a proponent of the view that the threshold of complexity required for open-ended evolution requires an interplay between symbolic memory and dynamical machinery, i.e. a strict genotype-phenotype separation. This idea has been labeled  semiotic closure and is generally understood to fit in the area of biosemiotics. He has defended that this principle of organization is at play in cognition and human collective behavior, having developed web technology to implement the principle. In addition to scientific work often mentioned in the media, he regularly publishes opinion articles in the popular media to disseminate scientific thinking.

References

External links 
 Prof. Rocha profile in Google Scholar, including list of publications
 Prof. Rocha page at Indiana University
 NSF-NRT Interdisciplinary Training in Complex Networks and Systems
 Indiana University, Bloomington
 Indiana University Network Institute
 Cognitive Science at Indiana University
 Instituto Gulbenkian de Ciencia, Portugal
 Prof. Rocha research group at the Gulbenkian Science Institute in Portugal
 Computational Biology PhD Program at Instituto Gulbenkian de Ciencia, Portugal
 Los Alamos National Laboratory
 Santa Fe Institute
 Semiotic Closure

Living people
Portuguese scientists
American computer scientists
Portuguese computer scientists
American people of Portuguese descent
Indiana University faculty
Binghamton University alumni
1966 births
Researchers of artificial life